The Trojan Brothers is a 1946 British comedy film directed by Maclean Rogers and starring Patricia Burke, David Farrar and Bobby Howes. It is an adaptation of the 1944 novel of the same title by Pamela Hansford Johnson.

Synopsis
The two halves of a London music hall act performing together as a pantomime horse have a sharp falling out when one of them begins a relationship with an attractive society woman.

Cast
 Patricia Burke as Betty Todd
 David Farrar as 	Sid Nichols
 Bobby Howes as 	Benny Castelli
 Barbara Mullen as Margie Castelli
 Lesley Brook as Ann Devon
 David Hutcheson as Cyril Todd
 Finlay Currie as W.H. Maxwell
 Wylie Watson as Stage Manager
 Joan Hickson as Ada
 Gus McNaughton as Frank
 George Robey as 	Old Sam
 Bransby Williams as Tom Hockaby
 Annette D. Simmonds as Charlie
 Roma Milne as Lorna
 Hugh Dempster as Tommy
 Grace Arnold as 	Mrs. Johnson
 Joyce Blair as 	Beryl Johnson
 Shirley Renton as Connie Johnson
 Carol Lawton as Sandra
 H. F. Maltby as Colonel Robbins
 Vincent Holman as P.C. Graves
 Vi Kaley as Mrs. Hopkins
 Doorn Van Steyn as Mrs. Hopkins' sister #1
 Joy Frankau as Mrs. Hopkins' sister #2
 Patricia Fox as Autograph hunter #1
 Olive Kirby as Autograph hunter #2
 Anders Timberg as Arnold Dench

References

Bibliography
 Murphy, Robert. Directors in British and Irish Cinema: A Reference Companion. British Film Institute, 2006.

External links
 

1946 films
1946 comedy films
British comedy films
Films directed by Maclean Rogers
Films based on British novels
Films set in London
1940s English-language films
1940s British films